Sheshtamad County is located in Razavi Khorasan province, Iran. The capital of the county is Sheshtomad. At the 2006 census, the county's population (as Sheshtamad District of Sabzevar County) was 25,273 in 6,973 households. The following census in 2011 counted 28,082 people in 8,437 households. At the 2016 census, the district's population was 24,261 in 7,786 households. It was separated from Sabzevar County in 2020 to form Sheshtamad County.

Administrative divisions

The population history of Sheshtamad County's administrative divisions (as Sheshtamad District of Sabzevar County) over three consecutive censuses is shown in the following table.

References

 

Counties of Razavi Khorasan Province